The Anindilyakwa people (Warnumamalya) are Aboriginal Australian people living on Groote Eylandt, Bickerton Island, and Woodah Island in the Gulf of Carpentaria in the Northern Territory of Australia.

Names
The accepted names for the Traditional Owners of the Groote archipelago are the Anindilyakwa people or Warnumamalya ('True People' in the Anindilyakwa language).

Although they have a strong sense of identity, the fourteen clans on Groote Eylandt and the surrounding islands did not have a collective name that they referred to themselves. They have been called the Warnindilyakwa in the past. However, this term refers to a specific clan from the Dilyakburra peninsula on the southeastern part of the island. Anthropologist Norman Tindale previously used , the Nunggubuyu word for Groote Eylandt people.

History

Macassan traders 
Macassans from Sulawesi traded with northern Australian Aboriginal people long before the arrival of Europeans. Exploiting the monsoonal winds in December of each year, they sailed down in praus, to trade for native trepang, beeswax, ironwood and pearls, which they brought back to supply the southern Chinese market, where, in particular, trepang was highly sought after as a delicacy. In exchange, they provided beads, metal, canoe technologies, sails, ceramics, earthenware pots and fishing hooks. The scale of the enterprise was large: Matthew Flinders came across one expedition involving some 1,000 sailors in 60 praus. After the Australian government started to impose taxes on this kind of Macassar-northern Australian commerce in the 1880s, it experienced a downturn, the last trading season concluding in 1906–1907.
They introduced tamarind to the island. The presence in four families of genetically transmitted Machado–Joseph disease is thought to derive from a Makassar ancestor who carried the disease.

European colonialisation

Church Mission Society 
By the 1950s, the Anindilyakwa had moved into settlements like Angurugu and Umbakumba, run by a church group called the Church Missionary Society. However, their lives would be drastically altered when manganese was discovered on the island.

Manganese mining 
In 1964, the Groote Eylandt Mining Company was given a lease over the island, in exchange for royalty payments to the Church Missionary Society. The first shipments of manganese ore left in 1966, and as of 2015, the mine was producing over 3 million tonnes of manganese a year, over 15% of total world production. The mine was expected to continue production until at least 2027.

Present-day 
The establishment of the mine caused upheavals in traditional land sensibilities since the Indigenous people were forcibly dislocated and compelled to live in close proximity to one another. As a consequence, two clans, the Mamarika and Amagula, have been feuding for some decades, perhaps reflecting a longer historical enmity, and on occasion eruptions of violence, involving also machetes, have broken out.

Language

The Anindilyakwa are speakers of Anindilyakwa. In the view of Arthur Capell, Anindilyakwa displayed perhaps "the most complicated grammar of any Australian language", a distinction it has come to share with the nearby mainland language of Nunggubuyu, also known as Wubuy. Anindilyakwa is unrelated to the Pama–Nyungan language family, which contains most Australian languages. It shares similar grammatical structures with Wubuy, though the two differ in basic vocabulary.

There is a dialect variant, spoken mainly by members of the Umbakumba community, which uses laminopalatals in place of laminodentals, and a stronger pitch. Anindilyakwa is characterised by prefixation for number, person and gender with regard to all (an exception concerns loanwords) nouns, adjectives, personal and demonstrative adjectives, and words are characteristically lengthy, ranging from two to as many as fourteen syllables.

Country and ecology
Anindilyakwa land extends some  encompassing three islands, Groote Eylandt, Bickerton, and Woodah. There are three Indigenous communities in the Groote Archipelago: Angurugu and Umbakumba on Groote Eylandt, and Milyakburra located on Bickerton Island.

Groote Eylandt has a variety of habitats: dense stands on monsoon forests rising behind coastal sand dunes, alternating with mangrove and mudflats. Sandstone outcrops and laterite provide excellent niches for shellfish.

The fruit of the Zamia palm called burrawang which, although containing the deadly toxin macrozamin, is reported to have been generally avoided, except as a "hard time food". But the Anindilyakwa have several methods of making it edible, by leaching it in running water for several days.

Kinship system
There are 14 clan groups on Groote Eylandt with their territories distributed all over the archipelago. The Warnindilyakwa people have been around for 8,000 years. From the mid-18th century onwards, through marriage and migration, many Nunggubuyu people from the adjacent mainland community of Numbulwar settled on the islands, amalgamating the two cultures. They are connected by a complex kinship system where they are all related to each other and bound by ceremonial participation.

These clans are patrilineal and are divided into two moieties. Unlike other Aboriginal people on the mainland, these moieties are not named. In English, they are referred to as Moiety 1 and Moiety 2.

Anindilyakwa surnames were adopted in the 1950s to comply with government regulations. Many of the surnames are derived from one of the clan's totems, i.e. Mamarika 'Southeast wind'. Before the last names had been adopted, Anindilyakwa referred to themselves as people from a certain area or of a particular totem.

Moieties

Poison cousins 
Like other Aboriginal cultures, 'poison cousins' or avoidance relationships exist in Anindilyakwa culture, where certain people are required to avoid family members or clan. Specific behaviours are necessary, such as no direct communication, facing each other, or proximity.

In popular culture

Anindilyakwa musicians 

 Emily Wurramara is an ARIA-nominated Anindilyakwa singer and songwriter from Groote Eylandt. She writes and sings songs in both English and Anindilyakwa.
 Yilila is a band from Numbulwar. Lead vocalist Grant Nundhirribala is a master of traditional music and a highly respected song man and dancer. The band performs their music in Wubuy, Anindilyakwa, Maccassan language and English.
 Other noteworthy bands include Mambali from Numbulwar, Groote Eylandt Band from Angurugu and Salt Lake Band from Umbakumba.

Film and television about Anindilyakwa 

 The Last Wave (released in the US as Black Rain) is a 1977 Australian mystery drama film directed by Peter Weir where a white lawyer represents a group of Aboriginal men accused of murder. Also starring Yolngu man David Gulpilil, local Anindilyakwa men Nandjiwarra Amagula, Walter, Roy Bara, Cedrick Lalara, and Morris Lalara portray the men on trial.
 Bakala is a 2017 award-winning short film written and directed by Nikolas Lachajczak and told entirely in the Anindilyakwa language. It follows the story of Anindilyakwa man, Steve 'Bakala' Wurramara, who is afflicted with Machado-Joseph Disease (MJD), a hereditary neurodegenerative disorder that results in a lack of muscle control and coordination of the upper and lower extremities.
 Anija is a 2011 award-winning short film written and directed by David Hansen. It is filmed mainly in the Anindilyakwa language and follows the experiences of one family dealing with the effects of alcohol addiction. The film won Best Indigenous Resource at the Australian Teachers of Media (ATOM) Awards in 2011.
 Anindilyakwa was featured in Spread the Word, an Indigenous Australian languages show on The Disney Channel. The show featured the Anindilyakwa word  which translate to 'kicking a tree to get something off of it.'

Commemoration 

 In 2019 the Royal Australian Mint issued a 50 cent coin to celebrate the International Year of Indigenous Languages which features 14 different words for 'money' from Australian Indigenous languages including  for Anindilyakwa. The coin was designed by Aleksandra Stokic in consultation with Indigenous language custodian groups.

Notes

Citations

Sources

Further reading

Aboriginal peoples of the Northern Territory